Remnants F.C. was an English association football club, made up of masters from St Mark's School in Windsor.

History
The club's first reported match was its first-ever FA Cup tie, against St Stephens of Westminster.  Although a new club, many of the Remnants players had played for Windsor Home Park F.C. and the St Mark's side in the previous season.

The club competed in the FA Cup in the 1870s.  The club tended to enter the FA Cup in years Windsor Home Park did not do so, although in 1880–81 and 1881–82 both teams did so.  The club's last entry was in 1882–83, but it scratched when drawn to play Reading Minster F.C. in the first round, captain T. B. Hughes playing for fellow Slough side the Swifts instead.

Notable players

John Hawtrey and Edward Hagarty Parry, both capped for England when members of Remnants F.C.

References

Defunct football clubs in England
Association football clubs established in 1877
Association football clubs disestablished in the 19th century
Defunct football clubs in Berkshire